Sidun may refer to:
 Saydun
 Sidun, Iran